Allium struzlianum, or Struzl's onion, is a species of onion that is endemic to Armenia. It has been found in the Dzhadzhur Pass and the Urts Range. It can be found on montane steppes between elevations of 800–2,000 m. It flowers in May–June, and bears fruit in June–July.

The species is very rare with a severely fragmented population, estimated to be less than 250 individuals. It is threatened by habitat loss and pasturing.

References

struzlianum
Endangered plants
Endemic flora of Armenia
Plants described in 1999